Traicho is a Bulgarian masculine given name. Notable people with the name include:

Traicho Draganov, Bulgarian sprint canoer
Traicho Kostov (1897–1949), Bulgarian politician

Bulgarian masculine given names